Hemiculterella is a genus of cyprinid fish that occurs in eastern Asia.  There are currently three species in this genus.

Species
 Hemiculterella macrolepis Y. R. Chen, 1989
 Hemiculterella sauvagei Warpachowski, 1887
 Hemiculterella wui (Ki. Fu. Wang, 1935)

References

 

Cyprinid fish of Asia
Cyprinidae genera